Mads Hjalmar Hansen (born 10 April 2001) is a Danish footballer who plays for Danish Superliga club SønderjyskE as a midfielder.

Career

SønderjyskE
Hansen is a product of SønderjyskE and has played his entire youth career for the club. In the winter 2019, Hansen played several friendly games for the first team and was also training with them once in a while. On his 18th birthday, 10 April 2019, Hansen signed a five-year contract with the club. This was the first time in the club's history, that they had signed a five-year contract with a youth player.

He got his official debut for the club on 5 September 2019 in a 5-0 Danish Cup victory against BK Viktoria. Hansen played the whole game and was also noticed for an assist. His debut in the Danish Superliga came on 6 October 2019 against Esbjerg fB. Hansen came on the pitch with a few minutes left with shirt number 23, replacing Johan Absalonsen in a 2-1 victory.

On 1 February 2022, Hansen was loaned out to Danish 2nd Division club Kolding IF for the rest of the season, to gain some experience.

References

External links
Mads Hansen at DBU

Danish men's footballers
Danish Superliga players
2001 births
Living people
SønderjyskE Fodbold players
Kolding IF players
Association football midfielders
Denmark youth international footballers